Mikhail Chekanov (born January 13, 1961) is a Russian ice hockey coach. He coached the Russian national team at the 2015 IIHF Women's World Championship.

References

1961 births
Living people
Russian ice hockey coaches
Place of birth missing (living people)
Russian expatriate ice hockey people
Russian expatriate sportspeople in China